Mirko Nišović (born July 2, 1961) is a Serbian retired sprint canoeist who competed from the late 1970s to the late 1980s. Competing in three Summer Olympics, he won two medals at Los Angeles in 1984 with a gold in the C-2 500 m and a silver in the C-2 1000 m events, in team with Matija Ljubek.

Nišović also won six medals at the ICF Canoe Sprint World Championships with three golds (C-2 500 m: 1982, 1983; C-2 10000 m: 1985), two silvers (C-2 1000 m: 1982, 1985), and one bronze (C-2 1000 m: 1983).

References

External links
 

1961 births
Canoeists at the 1980 Summer Olympics
Canoeists at the 1984 Summer Olympics
Canoeists at the 1988 Summer Olympics
Living people
Olympic canoeists of Yugoslavia
Olympic gold medalists for Yugoslavia
Olympic silver medalists for Yugoslavia
Serbian male canoeists
Yugoslav male canoeists
Olympic medalists in canoeing
ICF Canoe Sprint World Championships medalists in Canadian

Medalists at the 1984 Summer Olympics
Mediterranean Games gold medalists for Yugoslavia
Competitors at the 1979 Mediterranean Games
Mediterranean Games medalists in canoeing